This is a list of notable individuals born in Ecuador of Lebanese ancestry or people of Lebanese and Ecuadoran dual nationality who live or lived in Ecuador.

Athletes
 Abdalá Bucaram, Jr. – football (soccer) player (son of former President Abdalá Bucaram)

Beauty pageant contestants
 Valeska Saab – Miss World Ecuador 2007

Entertainment
 Diego Spotorno – actor and television presenter

Musicians
 Jorge Saade – violinist
 Nicasio Safadi – musician

Politicians
 Ivonne Baki – Minister of Tourism
 Abdalá Bucaram – former president
 Alberto Dahik – former vice president
 Jamil Mahuad – former president (1998–2000)
 Jaime Nebot – politician
 Julio Teodoro Salem – former president

See also
Lebanese Ecuadorian
List of Lebanese people
List of Lebanese people (Diaspora)

References

Ecuador
Lebanese
Lebanese